The DR Congo women's national under-18 and under-19  is a national basketball team of Mali and is governed by the Basketball Federation of Democratic Republic of Congo. 
It represents Democratic Republic of the Congo in international under-19 and under-18 (under age 19 and under age 18) women's basketball competitions.

The team was formerly known as the Zaire women's national under-18 and under-19 basketball team.

See also
 DR Congo women's national basketball team
 DR Congo national under-19 basketball team

References

Basketball
Basketball
Women's national under-19 basketball teams